Ozaawindib ("Yellow Head" in English, recorded variously as Oza Windib, O-zaw-wen-dib, O-zaw-wan-dib, Ozawondib, etc.) (Ojibwe) was an early 19th century (fl. 1797-1832)   warrior. They had several husbands, at times wore attire typicially associated with women, and was considered in a number of ways to be gender-nonconforming.

Biography 
Ozaawindib was likely born in the mid to late seventeen hundreds. Ozaawindib's father was Wiishkobak ("Sweet" or "Le Sucre", recorded as "Wesh-ko-bug"), a chief of the Leech Lake Pillagers. By 1800, the Pilagers including Ozaawindib lived on Gaa-Miskwaawaakokaag near Leech Lake, terrain earlier inhabited by the Dakota people, engaged in warfare with migrating Ojibwe. Alexander Henry’s records from 1797 suggest that Wiishkobak tried to convince Ozaawindib to take up men’s clothing and roles.

When Tanner encamped on Red River of the North around 1800, he reports that he was the subject of interest of Ozaawindib, who at that time was about 50 years old and already had several husbands. Tanner reported that after rejecting repeated advances by Ozaawindib, Ozaawindib was still determined to win Tanner's heart. Ozaawindib disappeared for a few days and returned to camp with much needed fresh meat. However, even after bringing meat to the camp, Ozaawindib was still rejected by Tanner. Ozaawindib became the third wife of Chief Wenji-dotaagan as the solution to Ozaawindib's courtship efforts toward Tanner.

Alexander Henry reported from his Pembina Post in 1797 that when Ozaawindib was drunk, "he was not merely a nuisance but a bothersome man." By 1800, Ozaawindib and Wenji-dotaagan were listed by Henry as part of his crew, with Henry recalling Ozawiindib having been "the best runner among the Saulteurs [Ojibwe]", famous for a heroic feat during a fight with the Dakota.

In June 1832, Ozaawindib and another Ojibwe from Gaa-Miskwaawaakokaag were traveling to the fort at Sault Ste. Marie to inform the Indian agent Henry Rowe Schoolcraft about a war party from Leech Lake, departing to pursuit the Dakota. They met Schoolcraft, accompanied by an expedition of men, near Fond du Lac. He convinced Ozaawindib to turn around and serve as his guide back to Gaa-Miskwaawaakokaag. Ozaawindib guided Schoolcraft and his men to Gaa-Miskwaawaakokaag and then to Omashkoozo-Zaaga’igan, renamed by Schoolcraft to Lake Itasca. After visiting the source of the Mississippi River, the expedition returned to the Ojibwe village on Gaa-Miskwaawaakokaag. On July 16th, 1832, Schoolcraft called a formal council, where he recognmized Ozaawindib as a chief by presenting the guide a medal. According to Schoolcraft, there was no ogimaa (hereditary chief) present in the village, but Ozaawindib was “the principal man in the band.” Schoolcraft did not mention the aayaakwe status or any gender nonconformity from Ozaawindib. However, Schoolcraft's guide had the same home and father's name as Ozaawindib described by Tanner and Henry, implying it was the same person.

Legacy 
Ozaawindib is remembered in place names such as Lake Plantagenet (Ozaawindibe-zaaga'igan) and Schoolcraft River (Ozaawindibe-ziibi) in the Anishinaabe language, and as Yellow Head Point of Lake Itasca in English. 

In the 2016 antology Love Beyond Body, Space, and Time, Niigaan Sinclair tells Ozaawindib’s story in context of Two-Spirit experiences.

References

Bibliography
 Catlin, George. (1841) Letters and notes on the Manners, Customs and Condition of the Indians of North America, 1832-39. London: Tosswill and Myers.
 Coues, Elliott, ed. (1897) New Light on the Early History of the Greater Northwest: The Manuscript Journals of Alexander Henry and of David Thompson. New York: Francis P. Harper.
 Gilfillan, J. A. (1893) Manuscripts of Rev. J. A. Gilfillan. St. Paul: Minnesota Historical Society Press.
 James, Edwin, ed. (1830) Captivity of John Tanner. New York.
 Schooolcraft, Henry Rowe. (1834) Narrative of an Expedition Through the Upper Mississippi to Itasca Lake: The Actual Source of This River. New York: Harper & Brothers.
 —————, (1851, reprint 1975) Personal Memoirs Of A Residence Of Thirty Years With The Indian Tribes On The American Frontiers. Philadelphia: Lippincott, Grambo and Co., reprint New York: Arno Press
 Warren, William W. (1885, reprint 1984) History of the Ojibway People. St. Paul: Minnesota Historical Society Press.

18th-century births
19th-century deaths
Ojibwe people
People of pre-statehood Minnesota
People of pre-statehood Wisconsin
Two-spirit people